Tiddles, also known as the Paddington Station cat, (1970–1983) was a tabby-and-white cat who spent most of his life in the ladies' room at Paddington Station, in London. Constantly fed choice meats, including titbits from his admirers, he became famously fat.

On a cold morning in 1970, Tiddles was adopted as a six-week-old stray kitten by June Watson, an attendant in the ladies' room at Paddington Station. Women began to come to visit him there. In addition to fan letters, Christmas presents and a Christmas tree, Tiddles received food from many of his admirers, which was stored in his personal refrigerator; some posted food to him. As a result of his high-fat, high-calorie diet of delicacies such as chicken livers, kidneys, rabbit, and steak, the frequent titbits from admirers, and lack of exercise, Tiddles became very fat. He was one of the most famous fat cats (making his name ironic, as he was "anything but 'tiddly'"). He was filmed by a Canadian camera crew, featured in foreign magazines, and in 1993, painted by Frances Broomfield.

Attempts to reduce his weight did not work because his fans continued to overfeed him. Tiddles was euthanised in 1983 after veterinarians found fluid around his lungs.

See also
 List of individual cats

References

Further reading
 Martyn Lewis, Cats in the News, Macdonald, 1991,

External links
 Top 15 Amazingly Ginormous Fat Cats, Neatorama

1970 animal births
1983 animal deaths
Individual cats in England
Paddington